Donal Donnelly (6 July 1931 – 4 January 2010) was an Irish theatre and film actor. Perhaps best known for his work in the plays of Brian Friel, he had a long and varied career in film, on television and in the theatre. He lived in Ireland, the UK and the US at various times, and his travels led him to describe himself as "an itinerant Irish actor".

Early life
Donal Donnelly was born to Irish parents in Bradford, Yorkshire, England. His father James was a doctor from County Tyrone, and his mother Nora O'Connor was a teacher from County Kerry.

He was raised in Dublin where he attended school at Synge Street Christian Brothers School in Dublin where he acted in school plays with Milo O'Shea, Eamonn Andrews, Jack MacGowran, Bernard Frawley (Seattle Repertory Co.) and Jimmy Fitzsimons (brother of Maureen O'Hara), under the direction of elocution teacher, Ena Burke.

Acting career

Stage
Donnelly toured with Anew McMaster's Irish repertory company before moving to England where he starred with Rita Tushingham in the film The Knack ...and How to Get It.

His breakthrough role came when he was cast as Gar Private in the world premiere of Brian Friel's Philadelphia, Here I Come! directed by Hilton Edwards for the Gate Theatre at the Dublin Theatre Festival in 1964. The production subsequently transferred to Broadway where it played for over 300 performances and established Donnelly and Patrick Bedford – who played his alter-ego Gar Public – as formidable new talents to be reckoned with. They were jointly nominated for the Tony Award for Best Performance by a Leading Actor in a Play in 1966.

Donnelly returned to Broadway a number of times, replacing Albert Finney in A Day in the Death of Joe Egg in 1968, playing Milo Tindle in Anthony Shaffer's Sleuth and appearing as Frederick Treves opposite David Bowie as The Elephant Man. He also renewed his relationship with Brian Friel, appearing in the world premieres of Volunteers at the Abbey Theatre in 1975 and Faith Healer with James Mason (Longacre Theatre, NYC) in 1979 as well as the Broadway premieres of Dancing at Lughnasa in 1991 and Translations in 1995.

For many years, he toured a one-man performance of the writings of George Bernard Shaw, adapted and directed by Michael Voysey and entitled My Astonishing Self.

Film and TV
His film roles included Archbishop Gilday in The Godfather Part III and he gained particular acclaim for his performance as Freddy Malins in John Huston's final work, The Dead, based on the short story by James Joyce.

On television, he played the lead role of Matthew Browne in the 1970s ITV sitcom Yes Honestly, opposite Liza Goddard. But from the late 1950s onwards, he often appeared in such British TV programs as The Avengers, Z Cars and The Wednesday Play.

Other work 
He was an acclaimed audiobook reader whose catalogue includes Pinocchio, Peter Pan, Voltaire's Philosophical Dictionary, and several audio versions of the works of James Joyce.

In 1968, he recorded an album of Irish songs Take the Name of Donnelly, which was arranged, produced and conducted by Tony Meehan formerly of the Shadows.

Death
He died in Chicago, Illinois, on 4 January 2010 from cancer, aged 78, and is survived by his wife, Patricia 'Patsy' Porter – a former dancer he met working on Finian's Rainbow, and two sons, Jonathan and Damian. His daughter Maryanne predeceased him.

Filmography

References

External links

 Obituary in The Times

1931 births
2010 deaths
Deaths from cancer in Illinois
Irish male film actors
Irish male television actors
Irish male stage actors
Male actors from Bradford
Male actors from Dublin (city)
Irish expatriates in England
Irish expatriate male actors in the United States
People educated at Synge Street CBS